Asistencias or visitas were smaller sub-missions of Catholic missions established during the 16th-19th centuries of the Spanish colonization of the Americas. They allowed the Catholic church and the Spanish crown to extend their reach into native populations at a modest cost.

Description
Asistencias were much smaller than the main missions with living quarters, workshops and crops in addition to a church. They were typically staffed with a small group of clergymen and a relatively small group of indigenous neophytes in order to maintain the complex.

Particularly strategic asistencias were later elevated to the status of a full mission. This typically included an expansion of existing facilities to support a larger clergy and indigenous neophyte population, improvement of basic infrastructure such as roads, and rechristening under a new Catholic saint.

List of asistencias
The following is a list of asistencias that remained so at the time of their abandonment, sorted by year of establishment.

Arizona
 Visita de San Ignacio de Sonoitac was established in 1691 as a visita to Mission San Cayetano de Tumacácori.

Baja California
 Visita de Calamajué was established in 1766 as a visita to Misión San Francisco Borja.
 Visita de San Telmo was established in 1798 as a visita to Misión Santo Domingo de la Frontera.

Baja California Sur
 Visita de San Juan Bautista Londó was established in 1699 as a visita to Misión San José de Comondú.
 Visita de Angel de la Guarda was established in 1721 as a visita to Misión de Nuestra Señora del Pilar de La Paz Airapí.
 Visita de la Presentación was established in 1769 as a visita to Misión San Francisco Javier de Viggé-Biaundó.
 Visita de San Juan de Dios was established in 1769 as a visita to Misión San Fernando Rey de España de Velicatá.
 Visita de San José de Magdalena was established in 1774 as a visita to Misión Santa Rosalía de Mulegé.

California
 San Pedro y San Pablo Asistencia was established in 1786 as an asistencia to Mission San Francisco de Asís.
 San Antonio de Pala Asistencia was established in 1816 as an asistencia to Mission San Luis Rey de Francia.
 Santa Ysabel Asistencia was established in 1818 as an asistencia to Mission San Diego de Alcalá.

Sonora
 Visita de San José de Ímuris was established in 1687 as a visita to Misión San Ignacio de Caborica.
 Visita de Santa Teresa de Atil was established in 1692 as a visita to Mission San Pedro y San Pablo del Tubutama.

List of former asistencias
The following is a list of asistencias that were elevated to the status of mission, sorted by year of establishment.

Arizona
 Mission San Cosme y Damián de Tucsón was established in 1692 as the Visita de San Agustín to Mission San Xavier del Bac. It was elevated to the status of mission in 1768.

Baja California Sur
 Misión Nuestra Señora de los Dolores del Sur Apaté was established in 1721 as the Visita de la Pasión to Misión Nuestra Señora de los Dolores del Sur Chillá. It was elevated to the status of mission in 1733.
 Misión Santa Rosa de las Palmas was established in 1724 as the Visita de Todos Santos to Misión de Nuestra Señora del Pilar de La Paz Airapí. It was elevated to the status of mission in 1733.

California
 Mission San Rafael Arcángel was established as a medical asistencia to Mission San Francisco de Asís in 1817. It was elevated to the status of mission 1822.

Sonora

Misión San Valentin del Bizani was established as a visita to Misión San Ignacio de Caborica in 1687. It was elevated to the status of mission in 1694.
Misión San Diego de Pitiquito was established as a visita to Misión San Ignacio de Caborica in 1689. It was elevated to the status of mission in 1695.

See also
 Estancia - Spanish colonial ranch

References

 X
.A
The Californias